The 1998–99 season was the Persepolis's 8th season in the Azadegan League, and their 16th consecutive season in the top division of Iranian Football. They were also be competing in the Hazfi Cup. Persepolis was captained by Hossein Abdi.

Squad

Mid-season Transfers

In

Out

Technical staff

|}

Competitions

Overview

Azadegan League

Standings

Matches

Hazfi Cup 

Round of 32

Round of 16

Quarterfinals

Semifinals

Final

Scorers

Goalkeeping

References

Persepolis F.C. seasons
Persepolis